Pachyta erebia is the species of the Lepturinae subfamily in long-horned beetle family. This beetle is distributed in Japan.

Subtaxons 
There are two varietets in species:
 Pachyta erebia var. kusamai Hayashi, 1955 
 Pachyta erebia var. tamanukii Hayashi & Iga, 1945

References

Lepturinae
Beetles described in 1884